Richard Hayley Lever (28 September 1876 – 6 December 1958) was an Australian-American painter, etcher, lecturer and art teacher. His work was part of the art competitions at the 1928 Summer Olympics and the 1932 Summer Olympics.

Life and work
Lever was born in Bowden, South Australia on 28 September 1875, the son of Albion W. Lever. He excelled in painting classes at Prince Alfred College under James Ashton and on leaving school continued to study under Ashton at his Norwood art school. He was a charter member of the Adelaide Easel Club in 1892.

Lever's maternal grandfather Richard Hayley, owner of Bowden Tannery, died in 1882, and the subsequent inheritance was sufficient for Lever to finance a trip to England in 1899 to further his career in painting. He moved to St. Ives, a fishing port and artistic colony on the Cornish coast. The town's reputation as a centre for marine painting was largely due to Julius Olsson, who became a prominent British seascape painter.  In St. Ives, Lever shared a studio with Frederick Judd Waugh, and studied painting techniques under the Impressionists Olsson and Algernon Talmage.  Lever also painted in the French port villages of Douarnenez and Concarneau, Brittany, directly across the English Channel from St. Ives.

In late 1904 Lever made a trip back to Adelaide, where his mother was dying of tuberculosis. During his twelve-month stay he staged several exhibitions, painted seascapes and taught. In 1906, upon returning to Europe, he married Aida Smith Gale in St. Ives' Parish Church. In 1908, Lever did a series of paintings called Van Gogh's Hospital, Holland expressing the profound influence he felt from that artist.

In 1911, Ernest Lawson, an Impressionist painter, persuaded Lever to move to United States, saying he would have greater success there. Lever arrived in New York City in 1912 and painted views of the Hudson River, Times Square and Central Park. Upon discovering the American east coast, he painted in Gloucester, Massachusetts for several summers and at Marblehead, Massachusetts. Both artists developed spontaneous, bold painting styles, and Lever was accepted into Lawson's circle of friends: Robert Henri, William Glackens, John Sloan and George Bellows. He exhibited with this group regularly, but eventually left New York to settle in Massachusetts.

From 1919 to 1931, Lever taught art classes at the Art Students League of New York where he maintained a Gloucester studio and often traveled to paint on Nantucket and Martha's Vineyard. He offered this message to his students: "Art is the re-creation of mood in line, form and color. If I were confined to my own back yard for the rest of my life, I'd still have more pictures in my mind than I would have time to paint. Art is nothing but having a good time." Lever went to Pittsburgh in 1922 as an art juror for the Carnegie International exhibition.

In 1924, Lever was commissioned to paint a portrait of the presidential yacht, which was subsequently presented to President Calvin Coolidge in the Cabinet Room of the White House.

By 1930, Lever had moved to Caldwell, New Jersey, staying there until 1938, when he moved to Mount Vernon, New York. While living in New York, Lever painted marines and landscapes in New Jersey, New England, New York and the Canadian Maritimes. Throughout his life, he traveled and painted extensively, including Nova Scotia and Grand Manan Island in Canada, The Bahamas and Florida, while often returning to Europe. In 1933, Hayley was named Director of the Green Mountains summer art school at Smugglers Notch in Stowe, Vermont. Lever also taught painting classes at the Forum School of Art in Bronxville, New York from 1934 to 1935.

In later life, Lever was inflicted with arthritis in his right hand, which prevented him from further travel and forced him to concentrate on still-life subjects instead. As his arthritis advanced, he taught himself to paint with his left hand. However, following the death of his wife Aida in 1949, Lever was confined to his home, where he continued to paint from 1953 until his death.

Hayley Lever died on 6 December 1958 at his home in Mount Vernon, New York. News of his death surprised some: Lever had all but disappeared from public view over two decades earlier, despite once having been enormously popular and critically acclaimed. Even so, he had continued to paint in the intervening years to such a degree that colleagues and dealers alike were confounded by the cache of unsold, and largely unseen, paintings in his Mount Vernon barn. Since his death, he has been recognized as one of the leaders of American Impressionism in the 20th century.

Displayed works/exhibitions

Displayed works
White House
The Hirshhorn Museum and Sculpture Garden
 Baltimore Museum of Art
 Detroit Institute of Arts, Michigan
 The Montclair Art Museum, New Jersey
The Brooklyn Museum of Art
 The Nantucket Historical Association, Massachusetts
 New Britain Museum of Art, Connecticut
 Corcoran Gallery of Art, Washington, D.C.
Dallas Museum of Art
The Wichita Art Museum 
Des Moines Art Museum
Fort Worth Museum of Art
L.A. County Museum of Art
The Westmoreland Museum of American Art
Telfair Academy
National Arts Club
National Academy of Design
Memphis Art Museum; Australia Art Museum
Cincinnati Art Museum
The Addison Gallery of American Art
Sydney Art Gallery of Australia
Art Gallery of South Australia (one work only – The last glow, St. Ives fishing fleet)

Exhibitions

Memberships
 National Academy of Design
 National Arts Club
 New Society of Artists
 Royal Society of British Artists
 Royal Institute of Oil Painters
 Royal West of England Academy

References
Shadowland Magazine, November 1922. "Hayley Lever, Individualist (The artist who believes that man may draw inspiration from all sources, but that the only deadly sin is imitation)" by Holger Cahill. p. 11, 77
Art & Antiques, 2003 March, Gallery Watch	
American Art Review, 1996 March, Valley of Work: Scenes of Industry
Hayley Lever, Carol Lowrey, Spanierman Gallery, New York: 2003
Hayley Lever, 1876–1958 : works in various media : an exhibition at the Delaware Art Museum, 23 June – 13 August 1978.
Falk, Peter H., Who Was Who In American Art. Madison, Connecticut: Sound View Press, 1985. p. 368.

Notes

External links
Art Encyclopedia
The Getty Museum Union list of Artist names
Hayley Lever examples on AskArt.com
 "The Exhibition", 1905 article from The Advertiser, Adelaide, 22 March 1905.
Three Lever exhibition catalogs from The Metropolitan Museum of Art Libraries (fully available online as PDF)

1876 births
1958 deaths
20th-century American painters
American male painters
American Impressionist painters
American landscape painters
Australian emigrants to England
Australian emigrants to the United States
Australian painters
Cityscape artists
Members of the Royal West of England Academy
Modern painters
National Academy of Design members
Artists from Adelaide
Members of the Royal Society of British Artists
Olympic competitors in art competitions
20th-century American male artists